Varudi-Vanaküla is a village in Sõmeru Parish, Lääne-Viru County, in northeastern Estonia. It has a population of 45 (as of 1 January 2010).

References

Villages in Lääne-Viru County